Herbert Haupt (born 28 September 1947) is an Austrian politician and former party chairman of the Austrian Freedom Party. Born in Seeboden, Carinthia, and a veterinarian by training, he was federal Minister of Social Services from 2000 till 2005 in a coalition government headed by Wolfgang Schüssel. Haupt was Vice Chancellor of Austria from 28 February 2003 until 20 October 2003.

He is still a member of the National Council of Austria, now representing the Alliance for the Future of Austria (BZÖ) party founded by Jörg Haider in April 2005.

He stepped down as Minister of Social Services in January 2005 and was succeeded by Ursula Haubner, Jörg Haider's sister.

See also 
 Austrian Freedom Party
 Jörg Haider (party leader 1986 - 2001)
 Politics of Austria

References

External links 
 Biography, from the website of the Austrian parliament

1947 births
Living people
People from Spittal an der Drau District
Vice-Chancellors of Austria
Freedom Party of Austria politicians
Members of the National Council (Austria)
Austrian veterinarians
21st-century Austrian politicians